The 2002 Governor General's Awards for Literary Merit were  presented by Adrienne Clarkson, Governor General of Canada, at a ceremony at Rideau Hall on Tuesday, November 19. Each winner received a cheque for $15,000.

English

French

References 

Governor General's Awards
Governor General's Awards
Governor General's Awards
Governor General's Awards